Cremnosterna carissima is a species of beetle in the family Cerambycidae. It was described by Francis Polkinghorne Pascoe in 1857. It is known from India, Myanmar, Cambodia, Laos, Thailand, Vietnam and Nepal.

Varietas
 Cremnosterna carissima var. tesselata (White, 1858)
 Cremnosterna carissima var. unicolor Breuning, 1943

References

Lamiini
Beetles described in 1857